Études is a historic Roman Catholic journal published by the Society of Jesus (Jesuits). It was established by Ivan Gagarin in 1856. Its editor is François Euvé. Each issue is printed as a journal and published online on Cairn.info.

Further reading

References

Publications established in 1856
French-language journals
1856 establishments in France
Jesuit publications